The Eritrea women's national football team (Tigrinya: ኤርትራ ሃገራዊት ጋንታ ኩዕሶ እግሪ ደቂ ኣንስትዮ) is the national women's football team of Eritrea and is overseen by the Eritrean National Football Federation (ENFF), the governing body of football in Eritrea. It has neither qualified for the finals of the FIFA Women's World Cup nor the Africa Women Cup of Nations.

It is managed by Ghezai Tesfagabir and plays its home games in Asmara. Eritrea is currently unranked in the FIFA Women's World Rankings for being inactive for more than 18 months.

Team image

Home stadium
The Eritrea women's national football team play their home matches on the Cicero Stadium.

Results and fixtures

The following is a list of match results in the last 12 months, as well as any future matches that have been scheduled.

Legend

2023

Coaching staff

Current coaching staff

As of September 2022

Manager history

??? (2022– )

Players

Current squad
 The following players were named on 10 October 2021 for the 2022 Africa Women Cup of Nations qualification tournament. 

 Caps and goals accurate up to and including 30 October 2021.

Recent call-ups
The following players have been called up to a Eritrea squad in the past 12 months.

Head-to-head record
need update

Competitive record

FIFA Women's World Cup

Olympic Games

Africa Women Cup of Nations

African Games

CECAFA Women's Championship

References

External links
FIFA Team Profile

African women's national association football teams
Eritrea women's national football team